"On the Extinction of the Venetian Republic, 1802" is a Petrarchan sonnet written by the English poet William Wordsworth.

Text 
Wordsworth composed the sonnet in August 1802, and it was first published in Poems, in Two Volumes (1807). It was included among the "Sonnets dedicated to Liberty"; re-named in 1845, "Poems dedicated to National Independence and Liberty".

Analysis 

The special glory of Venice dates from the conquest of Constantinople by the Latins in 1202. The Fourth Crusade—in which the French and Venetians alone took part—started from Venice, in October 1202, under the command of the Doge, Henry Dandolo. Its aim, however, was not the recovery of Palestine, but the conquest of Constantinople. At the close of the crusade, Venice received the Morea, part of Thessaly, the Cyclades, many of the Byzantine cities, and the coasts of the Hellespont, with three-eighths of the city of Constantinople itself, the Doge taking the title of 'Lord of three-eighths of the Roman Empire'.

This may refer to the prominent part which Venice took in the Crusades, or to the development of her naval power, which made her mistress of the Mediterranean for many years, and an effective bulwark against invasions from the East.

The origin of the Venetian State was the flight of many of the inhabitants of the mainland—on the invasion of Italy by Attila—to the chain of islands that lie at the head of the Adriatic.

In 1177, Pope Alexander III appealed to the Venetian Republic for protection against the German Emperor. The Venetians were successful in a naval battle at Saboro, against Otho, the son of Frederick Barbarossa. In return, the Pope presented the Doge Liani with a ring, with which he told him to wed the Adriatic, that posterity might know that the sea was subject to Venice, "as a bride is to her husband".

In September 1796, nearly six years before this sonnet was written, the fate of the old Venetian Republic was sealed by the Treaty of Campo Formio. The French army under Napoleon had subdued Italy, and, having crossed the Alps, threatened Vienna. To avert impending disaster, the Emperor Francis arranged a treaty which extinguished the Venetian Republic. He divided its territory between himself and Napoleon, Austria retaining Istria, Dalmatia, and the left bank of the Adige in the Venetian State, with the "maiden city" itself; France receiving the rest of the territory and the Ionian Islands. Since the date of that treaty the city has twice been annexed to Italy.

Translations 
The Hungarian translation by Miklós Radnóti is entitled „A Velencei Köztársaság halálára”.

See also 

 Fall of the Republic of Venice

References

Notes

Sources 
 Hill, Alan G. (1979). "On the Date and Significance of Wordsworth's Sonnet "On the Extinction of the Venetian Republic"". The Review of English Studies, 30(120), pp. 441–445. 
 Kelsall, Malcolm (1998). "'Once did she hold the gorgeous East in fee…': Byron's Venice and Oriental Empire". In T. Fulford and P. Kitson (eds.). Romanticism and Colonialism: Writing and Empire, 1780–1830. Cambridge: Cambridge University Press. pp. 243–260. 
 Knight, William, ed. (1896). The Poetical Works of William Wordsworth. Vol. 2. London: Macmillan & Co., Ltd.  
 MacGillivray, J. R. "On the Extinction of the Venetian Republic". RPO: Representative Poetry Online. University of Toronto Libraries. Retrieved 1 May 2022.

Poetry by William Wordsworth
1802 poems
Works about Venice